The 1983 Estonian SSR Football Championship was won by Tallinna Dünamo.

League table

References

Estonian Football Championship
Est
Football